Bon-e Kuh or Bonkuh or Bun-i-Kuh may refer to:
 Bon-e Kuh, Semnan